is a Japanese singer and actress from Hyōgo, Japan. Currently, she is an artist.

Her most famous TV role to date was on Pretty Guardian Sailor Moon as Hina Kusaka. She entered the spotlight at age 15 when she won the multimedia prize of the Japan Bishōjo Contest, a beauty contest. In 2001, Moeko released her first single "Natsu Iro" on the label Avex Trax. That same year, she released two other singles. After the release of her single, "Sotsugyō", she switched her main focus to acting.

Major television roles include Pretty Guardian Sailor Moon; she also appeared on stage as Sleeping Beauty in 2006 and 2007.

Discography

Singles 
 (2001.06.13) "Natsu Iro"
 (2001.08.29) "Ame Agari" (also used as one of the end themes for the anime series Battle Doll Angelic Layer)
 (2001.11.21) "Hello"
 (2002.02.14) "Sotsugyō" ("Graduation"; a cover of Yuki Saito's 1985 debut single)
 (2003.01.08) "Ame" (a cover of Chisato Moritaka's 1990 single)

DVD 
 (2002.03.13) "Moeco TV"

Cast

TV 
 2002: NBA Mania – main personality regular
 2002: BEAT BOX!! – Monday, Wednesday regular
 2003: Otakara Eizō Kuizu Mireba Nattoku! – Guest panelists
 2003: Yankī Bokōnikaeru – Tezuka Mayumi
 2003–2004: Pretty Guardian Sailor Moon – Hina Kusaka
 2004: Ai no Sorea – Tadokoro Rinko (child)
 2005: Sanryūdaigakuōendan – Sasamoto Junko/ guest appearance
 2005: Yukemuri u~ōzu ~ Okami ni narimasu ~ – Kawamura Naoko
 2005: Satō 4 shimai  – Nishikawa Noriko
 2005: Taga kokoro nimo ryu wa nemuru

Movies 
 2005: Dare ga Kokoro ni mo Ryūhanemuru – Aizawa Chie
 2006: Memories of Matsuko 
 2006: Mayonaka no Shōjo-Tachi ~<First Story Shibuya Drops>

Stage 
 2006–2007: Sleeping Beauty (Mitsukoshi theater) – princess
 2007: Cross Sense (Theatre Ginza)
 2009: `Shigeru zō'~ Tozasareta Kako ~ (Kyobashi Kagetsu)
 2009: TOKYOWAY NEWSICAL [Tokyo Way New radical] "7@dash II"～Gyōmu Renraku! (The Pocket) – Starring the actress is no longer stay 
 2010: Genjimonogatari × Oguro Maki Song ~ Boku wa, Jūnihitoe ni Koi o Suru ~ (Ō Shima ginga theater)

Radio 
 2001: RIDE ON MUSIC nai "NEXT TRACKS・MOECO club" (TBS Radio, regular)
 2001–2003: Matsushita Moeko no moetsu CO club (Zenkoku 7-kyoku net)
 2002: Matsushita Moeko no Pine la mode (TFM・JFN, 33 station Internet radio golden age, New $ parlor nationwide) 
 2005–2006: Matsushita Moeko Nejikimami no J' s JOURNAL (CS digital broadcasting music, J-WAVE and USEN net broadcasting)
 2006: It is also the captain of the campaign in July listener's Week 2006 of the radio broadcaster of local Kansai Kobe.

CM/ad 
 2001: Otafuku Yakisoba Sōsu
 2003: Naganuma Shizu Kimono Gakuin Image Character
 2003: Mi Tama Matsuri Image Character

Bibliography

Book 
 Matsushita Moeko First Shashin-shū MOECO(2003)

Magazine series 
 MUSIQ? – series column "moeco to you" (Up to series vol.1 ~ vol.6, had served up vol.1 ~ vol.6 MC also a DVD that is attached to the "MUSIQ?". The resume from vol.10 only column)

External links 
 Official Site
 moeco*page Official Blog
 
 Moeko Matsushita at The Oracle
 
 Matsushita Moeko Jdorama.com

1982 births
Japanese actresses
Japanese idols
Avex Group artists
People from Kobe
Living people
Musicians from Kobe
21st-century Japanese singers
21st-century Japanese women singers